High4 (hangul: 하이포; stylized as HIGH4) was a South Korean boy band under the management of N.A.P Entertainment. The group consisted of members Alex, Myunghan, and Youngjun. They officially debuted into the Korean entertainment industry on April 8, 2014 with the song "Not Spring, Love, or Cherry Blossoms" featuring IU. On January 31, 2017, it was announced that leader Sunggu would be leaving the group.

On August 16, 2017, Alex announced on his Instagram live that the members have gone their separate ways and they would have their own solo activities, confirming the disbandment of High4.

Members

Former
 Sunggu (성구)
 Alex (Hangul: 알렉스)
 Myunghan (명한)
 Youngjun (영준)

Discography

Extended plays

Single albums

Singles

Awards and nominations

MelOn Music Awards

|-
| rowspan="2"|2014
| rowspan="2"|"Not Spring, Love, or Cherry Blossoms" (with IU)
| Hot Trend Award
| 
|-
|Song of the Year
|

Golden Disk Awards

|-
| rowspan="2"|2014
| "Not Spring, Love, or Cherry Blossoms" (with IU)
| Digital Bonsang
| 
|-
| High4
|Newcomer Award
|

Music programs win

Inkigayo 

|-
| 2014 
| May 11
| "Not Spring, Love, or Cherry Blossoms" 
|}

Notes

References 

South Korean boy bands
South Korean musical groups
Musical groups established in 2014
Musical groups disestablished in 2017
2014 establishments in South Korea